Emilio Vidal can refer to:

 Emilio Vidal (cyclist) (born 1929), a Venezuelan Olympic cyclist
 Emilio Vidal (wrestler) (born 1897), a Spanish Olympic wrestler